Sean Patrick Gilmartin (born May 8, 1990) is an American professional baseball pitcher who is a free agent. He has played in Major League Baseball (MLB) for the New York Mets, Baltimore Orioles and Tampa Bay Rays. Gilmartin was the 28th overall selection in the 2011 Major League Baseball draft by the Atlanta Braves. Prior to beginning his professional career, Gilmartin attended Florida State University, and was an All-American pitcher for the Seminoles baseball team.

Early years
Gilmartin was born in Moorpark, California, to Paul J., a chiropractor, and JoAnna Gilmartin. He attended Crespi Carmelite High School in Encino, California. After graduating from high school, the San Diego Padres selected Gilmartin in the 31st round of the 2008 Major League Baseball Draft. Gilmartin opted not to sign with San Diego, instead attending college.

Gilmartin enrolled at Florida State University in 2009, receiving a scholarship to play college baseball for the Florida State Seminoles baseball team. As a junior in 2011, Gilmartin was named an All-American by Baseball America.

Professional career

Atlanta Braves
Gilmartin was drafted by the Atlanta Braves in the first round, with the 28th overall selection, of the 2011 Major League Baseball Draft. He signed with the Braves, receiving a $1.134 million signing bonus. In the Atlanta farm system Gilmartin played with the Gulf Coast League Braves, Rome Braves, Mississippi Braves, and the Gwinnett Braves.

Prior to the 2012 season, Gilmartin was ranked as the Braves fifth best prospect by Baseball America. Gilmartin was invited to spring training in 2013, but did not make the team. He played for the Gwinnett Braves of the Class AAA International League, though his performance was limited by shoulder injuries.

Minnesota Twins

After the 2013 season, the Braves traded Gilmartin to the Minnesota Twins for Ryan Doumit on December 18, 2013. He pitched for the New Britain Rock Cats and the Rochester Red Wings in 2014.

Gilmartin with the Rock Cats finished 7–3, 3.12 ERA in 12 games in 72 innings pitched with 74 strikeouts with a WHIP of 1.278 while giving up 76 hits, 30 runs (25 of them earned), 2 home runs, and 16 walks.

With the Red Wings he finished 2–4, 4.28 ERA in 14 games in 73.2 innings pitched with 59 strikeouts with a WHIP of 1.317 while giving up 69 hits, 39 runs (35 of them earned), 7 home runs, and 28 walks.

New York Mets

During the 2014 Winter Meetings, the New York Mets selected Gilmartin from the Twins in the Rule 5 draft on December 11. Gilmartin competed to make the Mets' Opening Day 25-man roster as a relief pitcher and got a spot in the bullpen. Gilmartin made his major league debut on April 10 against the Braves in a 5–3 loss, getting Nick Markakis to groundout and striking out Freddie Freeman to end the seventh inning.

On June 14, Gilmartin got his first win against the Braves, holding Atlanta scoreless through both the fifth and the sixth innings. He faced seven batters, walking one and striking out three, in a 10-8 Mets' victory. On July 19, he got his first major league hit, a bloop single into left field off Carlos Martínez, in his first major league at-bat, in the sixteenth inning against the St. Louis Cardinals. Gilmartin pitched three scoreless innings, in the fourteenth, fifteenth and the sixteenth innings, giving up 1 hit, 2 walks and getting 4 strikeouts while facing 12 batters.

After the Mets clinched the National League East division title, Gilmartin made his first major league start on October 1 against the Philadelphia Phillies at Citizens Bank Park, throwing five innings. He struck out three batters and allowed two runs and three hits, throwing 44 of 70 pitches for strikes. He retired 11 of the first 12 batters he faced in a game that lasted just 2 hours, 23 minutes. The two runs he allowed came on Darin Ruf's two-run home run in the 4th inning. However, the Mets lost the game by a score of 3–0.

When the Mets made the playoffs, Gilmartin was not on the roster for the Division Series, but was added to the roster for the Championship Series, replacing Erik Goeddel. Gilmartin did not appear in the championship series. Gilmartin appeared in game two of the World Series in the top of the eighth inning, retiring the two batters he faced. Gilmartin finished the 2015 regular season with a record of 3–2, and a 2.67 ERA in 50 games (one start) in  innings pitched, with 54 strikeouts and a WHIP of 1.186, while giving up 50 hits, 17 runs, two home runs, and 19 walks.

Gilmartin was cut from the roster heading into the 2016 season. Gilmartin was recalled to the Mets on May 12, replacing an injured Wilmer Flores on the roster. With the AAA 51s, Gilmartin had pitched 32.2 innings, sporting a 4–1 record with a 2.48 ERA and 1.13 WHIP. Days later, Gilmartin was sent back down to the 51s to make room for Matt Reynolds on the roster. Gilmartin had pitched five scoreless innings in two games during his brief call-up, giving up two hits and striking out five batters.

On June 11, 2017, the Mets designated Gilmartin for assignment.

St. Louis Cardinals
On June 11, 2017, Gilmartin was claimed off waivers by the St. Louis Cardinals. He was outrighted to AAA on September 1, 2017. He was released on July 2, 2018.

Baltimore Orioles
On July 12, 2018, Gilmartin signed a minor league deal with the Baltimore Orioles. He was called up to the majors on August 11, 2018. Gilmartin recorded a 3.00 ERA in 12 games for the Orioles in 2018. He was outrighted off the roster following the season and elected free agency on November 1. The following day, he re-signed with the Orioles on a minor league contract.

After starting the 2019 season in the minor leagues for the Orioles, Gilmartin had his contract selected to the majors on June 17, 2019. Gilmartin was designated for assignment on June 25, following the acquisition of Tayler Scott. He elected free agency on October 1, 2019.

Tampa Bay Rays
On February 8, 2020, Gilmartin signed a minor league deal with the Tampa Bay Rays. On August 7, 2020, Gilmartin was selected to the active roster. He was designated for assignment on August 9 and outrighted two days later. On August 22, Gilmartin was added back to the 40-man roster. Only a day after being re-added to the roster, Gilmartin was again designated for assignment by the Rays. On September 18, 2020, Gilmartin had his contract selected by the Rays for a third time. On September 29, Gilmartin was designated for assignment by the Rays for a third time. With the 2020 Tampa Bay Rays, Gilmartin appeared in 2 games, compiling a 0–0 record with 8.31 ERA and 5 strikeouts in 4.1 innings pitched. He became a free agent on November 2, 2020.

Long Island Ducks
On April 27, 2021, Gilmartin signed with the Long Island Ducks of the Atlantic League of Professional Baseball.

Minnesota Twins (second stint)
On June 29, 2021, Gilmartin's contract was purchased by the Minnesota Twins organization with a minor league contract for the AA Wichita Wind Surge. At 31, he is the oldest player in the AA Central. He elected free agency on November 7, 2021.

Personal life 
Gilmartin is married to former White House Press Secretary Kayleigh McEnany. They began dating in 2015 and married on November 18, 2017.  In June 2022 the couple announced that they are expecting their second child. On December 1, 2022, McEnany announced the birth of their son Nash on Twitter. 

Gilmartin's brother Michael was drafted by the Oakland Athletics from Wofford College as an infielder in the 27th round of the 2009 MLB draft. His cousin, Chad, previously worked in the White House Office of the Press Secretary.

References

External links

Florida State Seminoles bio

1990 births
Living people
People from Moorpark, California
Sportspeople from Ventura County, California
Baseball players from California
Major League Baseball pitchers
All-American college baseball players
New York Mets players
Baltimore Orioles players
Tampa Bay Rays players
Florida State Seminoles baseball players
Gulf Coast Braves players
Rome Braves players
Surprise Saguaros players
Mississippi Braves players
Gwinnett Braves players
New Britain Rock Cats players
Rochester Red Wings players
Las Vegas 51s players
Memphis Redbirds players
Norfolk Tides players
Wichita Wind Surge players